Roco Kingdom: The Desire of Dragon  is a 2013 Chinese animated film.

Reception
The film grossed ¥69.4 million in China.

See also
Roco Kingdom 3

References

Chinese animated films
2013 animated films
2013 films
Animated films based on video games